Wilhelm II's voyage to the Levant in 1898 was a state visit that the German Emperor undertook in the Ottoman Empire between  25 October and 12 November 1898.

Journey
The Kaiser started his journey to the Ottoman Eyalets with Istanbul on 16 October 1898; then he went by yacht to Haifa on 25 October. After visiting Jerusalem and Bethlehem, the Kaiser went back to Jaffa to embark to Beirut, where he took the train passing Aley and Zahlé to reach Damascus on 7 November. While visiting the Mausoleum of Saladin the following day, the Kaiser made a speech:

On 10 November, Wilhelm went to visit Baalbek before heading to Beirut to board his ship back home on 12 November.

German settlement in Palestine
His visit spurred interest in the German Templer colonies in Palestine. One of the Kaiser's traveling companions, Colonel Joseph von Ellrichshausen, initiated the formation of a society for the advancement of the German settlements in Palestine, named the Gesellschaft zur Förderung der deutschen Ansiedlungen in Palästina, in Stuttgart. It enabled the settlers to acquire land for new settlements by offering them low interest loans. A subsequent second wave of German settlers founded Wilhelma (named after the Kaiser, now called Bnei Atarot) in 1902 near Lod, Walhalla (1903) near the original Jaffa colony, followed by Bethlehem of Galilee (1906). The German Settlement Society successfully encouraged some of the Templers to return into the official, national Protestant Church. The non-Templar colony of Waldheim (now Alonei Abba) was subsequently founded next to Bethlehem of Galilee in 1907 by proselytized Templers now affiliated with the Old-Prussian State Church.

Herzl and Zionism

The visit resulted in the highest-profile political event in the life of Theodor Herzl, considered the founder of Zionism. Through the efforts of William Hechler, via the Frederick I, Grand Duke of Baden, Herzl publicly met Wilhelm II three times during the voyage, once in Istanbul (on 15 October 1898) and twice in Palestine (29 October and 2 November). The meetings significantly advanced Herzl's and Zionism's legitimacy in Jewish and world opinion.

During the Istanbul audience, the Kaiser asked Herzl what he wished him to ask of the Sultan: "Tell me in a word what I am to ask the Sultan," to which Herzl replied: "A Chartered Company – under German protection". The Kaiser brought the subject up twice with the Sultan; the Sultan refused, even in return for the Jews assuming the sizable Turkish foreign debt, as Zionism was highly unpopular amongst the local population in Palestine.

This was Herzl's first ever visit to Jerusalem, and was deliberately coordinated with that of Wilhelm II to secure public world recognition of himself and Zionism. Herzl and Wilhelm II first met publicly on 29 October, at Mikveh Israel, a small Rothschild-funded Jewish agricultural settlement. It was a brief but historic meeting. It was the first public acknowledgement of Herzl as the leader of the world Zionist movement by a major European power.  Photographs were taken of the event but poorly positioned so that only partials of the meeting were actually recorded. A problem occurred with the photography, but a photomontage composition of the images was made later for historical and world presentation. 

Herzl had a second formal, public audience with the emperor at the latter's tent camp on Street of the Prophets in Jerusalem on 2 November 1898.  

At the public presentations outside of Mikveh and Jerusalem, Herzl learnt that the Kaiser's request to the Sultan had not been successful, and the Kaiser no longer had interest in Herzl or Zionism. Although Kaiser Wilhelm had backed away from supporting Herzl's project, a number of press publications positioned the meeting as momentous and successful, as some political legitimacy had been lent to Herzl and Zionism.

Notable events

 In Damascus, scholars accompanying the Kaiser were allowed to examine the manuscripts in the Qubbat al-Khazna
 In Jerusalem, the Kaiser dedicated the Lutheran Church of the Redeemer, Jerusalem, and acquired land to build the Abbey of the Dormition and the Paulus-Haus for The German Association of the Holy Land
 In Jerusalem a large opening (a "breach") was created next to the pedestrian Jaffa Gate to allow the Kaiser to enter triumphally; the opening remains today 
 The Jerusalem Cross (Prussia) was awarded to those who traveled on the visit to Palestine and attended the inauguration of the Lutheran Church of the Redeemer

Bibliography
 
 
 
 Conrad Schick, 1898, Preparations made by the Turkish Authorities for the Visit of the German Emperor and Empress to the Holy Land in the Autumn of 1898

References 

Wilhelm II, German Emperor
History of Palestine (region)
1898 in politics